Curiquinca is a stratovolcano that straddles the border between Bolivia and Chile. It lies immediately E of Cerro Colorado and NE to volcán Escalante (El Apagado), all of which are considered to be part of the Sairecabur volcanic group. The light area behind the mountain is part of a large sulfur deposit, location of the - now abandoned - sulfur mines "Azufrera El Apagado" on the Chilean side and its counterpart "Azufrera Rosita" on the Bolivian side of the border.

See also
List of volcanoes in Bolivia
List of volcanoes in Chile

References

 (Spanish)

External links
 SI Google Earth Placemarks - Smithsonian Institution Global Volcanism Program: Download placemarks with SI  Holocene volcano-data.

Volcanoes of Antofagasta Region
Stratovolcanoes of Chile